Chervonosilske is a village in Amvrosiivka district, Donetsk region of eastern Ukraine.

History 
During the war in eastern Ukraine the village fell into the combat zone. On 29 August 2014, during the move back from IIovaisk, pro-Russian separatists troops with the support of the regular Russian army began shooting on Ukrainian Armed forces in the "green corridor".

The presence of the Russian military armed forces 
On 30 August 2014 combatants of the Ukrainian volunteer battalion were allegedly captured in Chervonosilske village by militants from Russian military forces and were held in captivity of "pro-Russian rebels in the city of Donetsk." Also, on the outskirts of Chervonosilske a fire engine ran on the position of the Russian T-72 (sixth separate tank brigade of the Russian Armed Forces), a tank fired direct fire. The soldiers of the volunteer battalion "Donbass" were disarmed by Russian paratroopers and handed to the pro-Russian rebels which were torturing them. There were a lot of captured Russian regular army soldiers which were handed over to representatives of the Russian command on the morning of August 30, 2014 in Chervonosilske.

References 

Villages in Donetsk Raion